Yongchun (Min Nan: Éng-chhun; lit. 'eternal spring') is a county in western Quanzhou city of southern Fujian province, People's Republic of China, located on the upper reaches of the Jin River. It is under the administration of Quanzhou City.

Many overseas Chinese in Southeast Asia have ancestors from Yongchun.

The county's historical sites include the Dongguan Bridge, an ancient covered bridge with a number of shrines inside. Originally built in 1145 and renovated a number of times since, the bridge is located in Dongmei village of Dongguan Township, on the road from Yongchun to the neighboring Xianyou County.

In 2011, the Taiwanese temple of goddess Mazu in Xingang opened a branch Mazu temple in the county, located in Chenban village. Instrumental to this foundation was Professor Chen, of the Chinese Academy of Social Sciences in Beijing, a scholar of goddess Mazu whose family lived in Chenban village, who in 2010 attended a conference in Xingang. The Xingang Mazu Temple funded the construction, and Professor Chen secured the necessary authorizations in Yongchun County to expand an existing temple to the Daoist Master Zhang Daoling by adding a Mazu Black Hall. The statue of Mazu is carried in procession through the county during the Chinese New Year holidays. The fame of the temple has helped placing Chenban village, whose name according to Professor Chen "nobody had ever heard before" on the map.

Yongchun is home to a Chinese martial art called Yongchun White Crane Kung Fu. The style was founded in the 17th century and Yongchun remains its ancestral centre to this day.

Administration

Towns (镇, zhen)
The county oversees 18 towns:

Townships
There are 4 townships:
Hengkou Township
Chengxiang Township
Jiefu Township
Waishan Township

Climate

See also
 John Preston Maxwell

References

External links

Quanzhou
County-level divisions of Fujian